Mahmoud Khalil (born 12 January 1995) is an Iraqi footballer who plays as a forward for Al-Karkh in the Iraqi Premier League.

International career
On 12 January 2021, Mahmoud Khalil made his first international cap with Iraq against UAE in a friendly.

References

External links 
 

1995 births
Living people
Iraqi footballers
Iraq international footballers
Al-Karkh SC players
Association football forwards